Joseph or Joe Gould may refer to:

 Joe Gould (writer) (1889–1957), writer, eccentric, homeless man
 Joe Gould's Secret, the 1965 book by Joseph Mitchell based on the writer
 Joe Gould's Secret (film), the 2000 film based on the above book
Joe Gould (boxing) (1896–1950), manager of boxer James J. Braddock
Joe Gould (rower) (1909–?), Australian Olympic rower
Joseph Gould (politician, born 1808) (1808–1886), farmer, businessman and political figure in Ontario, Canada
Joseph Gould (Canadian cultural figure) (1833-1913), a Montreal resident active especially in the music scene and cultural journalism of the city
Joseph Gould (politician, born 1911) (1911–1965), 20th century Ontario Liberal Party Member of Provincial Parliament